Out of the Ashes may refer to:

 Out of the Ashes (2003 film), an American TV film about the Holocaust
 Out of the Ashes (2010 film), a documentary of the Afghanistan national cricket team's qualification for the 2010 ICC World Twenty20 tournament
 Out of the Ashes (Ashes series), a post-apocalyptic novel by William W. Johnstone
 Out of the Ashes (Defiance album), 2002
 Out of the Ashes (Jessi Colter album), 2006
 Out of the Ashes (Katra album), 2010
 Out of the Ashes (book), a 2011 book by David Lammy
"Out of the Ashes" (The Walking Dead), an episode of The Walking Dead
 "Out of the Ashes", a song by Symphony X from The Divine Wings of Tragedy
 Spirit of Atlanta's 2015 Drum and Bugle Corps performance

See also 

 
 
 Out of Ashes, an album by Dead by Sunrise
 From the Ashes (disambiguation)
 Up from the Ashes (disambiguation)